"Lover" is a song written and performed by American singer-songwriter Taylor Swift, taken from her seventh studio album of the same name (2019). Aiming to create a timeless love song, Swift wrote the track about an intimate and committed relationship. The way that newlywed couples customize their marriage vows inspired the bridge, which draws on the bridal rhyme "Something old". Produced alongside Jack Antonoff, the song  combines country and indie folk over a waltz tempo. It has an acoustic-guitar-driven, retro-influenced balladic production consisting of snare drums, piano, pizzicato strings, and vocals saturated in reverberation.

Republic Records released "Lover" for digital download and streaming on August 16, 2019; the song became the album's third radio single the next month. Swift and Drew Kirsch directed the music video, which was released on August 22 and follows a couple living inside a dollhouse in a snow globe. Three alternate versions of "Lover" were released—a duet remix featuring Canadian singer Shawn Mendes, an orchestral remix based on Swift's performance at the 2019 American Music Awards subtitled "First Dance Remix", and a live version recorded at Swift's 2019 City of Lover concert.

Music critics lauded "Lover" for what they thought were emotionally engaging lyrics and a romantic production; many appreciated the production reminiscent of Swift's early albums. Publications including Billboard, Complex, and Pitchfork featured the song on their 2019 year-end lists. It was Swift's first solo-written track nominated for Song of the Year at the 2020 Grammy Awards, and its video received two MTV Video Music Award nominations. The single peaked within the top 10 in Australia, Canada, the United States, Ireland, Lebanon, New Zealand, and Singapore, and received multi-platinum certifications in the first three countries.

Writing and production

American singer-songwriter Taylor Swift described her seventh studio album, Lover, as a "love letter to love" that conveys an emotional spectrum "through a romantic gaze". The album took under three months to record; recording ended in February 2019. Released on August 23, 2019, through Republic Records, Lover musically draws on 1980s-inspired pop rock and synth-pop. Its songs explore many aspects of Swift's personality and altogether convey her emotional liberation to embrace future possibilities, renouncing the media gossip and celebrity-inspired themes on her previous album, Reputation (2017). Musician Jack Antonoff, who had worked with Swift on her two previous studio albums (1989 and Reputation), co-produced 11 tracks for Lover.

The title track, "Lover", is one of the three songs (alongside "Cornelia Street" and "Daylight") on the album that Swift wrote by herself. She wrote "Lover" late one night on piano at her home in Nashville, Tennessee. Though she quickly finished the refrain and the first verse, it took her longer to write the bridge, which she wanted to be a "fairy-tale lullaby fable expanding upon a song that has been not as detailed until that point", feeling that the verses were not up to her expectation. To that end, she was inspired by how newly-wed couples customize their marriage vows, and described the bridge as very personal and intimate. Swift said that "Lover" was the first "pure" love song she wrote, which she felt very proud of.

After finishing the lyrics, she sent a voice memo of the song to Antonoff; the two went to Electric Lady Studio in New York City together with recording engineer Laura Sisk the next day to record the song. Recording took six hours to complete. Because Swift wanted "Lover" to be a timeless love song, she envisioned as if it could have been played "at a wedding reception in 1980 or 1970 or now". She and Antonoff therefore used instruments that were all invented by the 1970s or earlier. They replaced the original piano with guitar, composed the bridge, and incorporated what Antonoff called a "Paul McCartney-inspired bass line". Other instruments Antonoff played were live drums, a bass guitar, an upright piano, and the Mellotron. According to the album's liner notes, Swift and Antonoff are credited as producers. Sisk and Antonoff, assisted by John Rooney, recorded the song. Serban Ghenea, assisted by John Hanes, mixed the track at MixStar Studios in Virginia Beach, Virginia.

Composition

Music

"Lover" is built upon a slow waltz tempo and a retro-styled musical motif. Swift said while recording, she imagined the production to sound like "just the last two people on a dance floor at 3 a.m. swaying". The track is driven by acoustic instruments, primarily guitars and percussion. The production incorporates piano, reverbed drums and vocals, and Mellotron-simulated, pizzicato strings. The rhythm is punctuated by booming snare drums and a bass line described by Vanity Fair Erin Vanderhoff as "sonorous, swung". Many critics compared the production to the music of alternative rock band Mazzy Star, specifically their 1993 single "Fade into You".

Roisin O'Connor of The Independent described the track as a tender, 1960s-styled acoustic ballad that shows Swift experimenting with rhythm and meter. Many music critics, including Alice Vincent of The Daily Telegraph, Louise Bruton of The Irish Times, and Annie Zaleski of The A.V. Club, characterized "Lover" as a country song, with Zaleski describing it as a country torch song and an indie folk production. Vincent and NME Karen Gwee considered the guitar-based melody of "Lover" a throwback to Swift's early country-music albums, with the former commenting that it is a "mature companion" to Fearless (2008) and Speak Now (2010). Nate Jones of Vulture, Nick Levine of NME, and Jon Caramanica of The New York Times described the song as alternative country.

Billboards Jason Lipshutz disagreed: "'Lover' is not a country song, but it certainly nods to the bare songwriting that marked much of Swift's early career." In The Atlantic, Spencer Kornhaber said that the track could have been a country-music song had the production trimmed down the reverb. Mikael Wood from the Los Angeles Times called the song "dream-folk", and The Ringer Lindsay Zoladz wrote that the single "doesn't sound like anything else currently popular" on either of country or pop radio formats.

Lyrics and interpretation
The lyrics to "Lover" are about a couple's committed and intimate relationship. In the verses, the narrator describes scenes of their domestic life, such as leaving the Christmas lights on past the holiday season and having their friends sleeping over on the living-room floor. Swift initially wrote the opening line as, "We could leave the Christmas lights up 'til April," but changed it to "up 'til January" on the final version. She explained that the change was meant to portray simple and universal experiences of couples who live together, "It's not about that being a crazy thing. It's about how mundane it is." At one point, the narrator asks if she has known her love "20 seconds or 20 years". She asks to commit to her partner in the refrain, "Can I go where you go?/ Can we always be this close?"

The marriage-vow-inspired bridge is a declaration of their romance, "Ladies and gentlemen will you please stand/ With every guitar string scar in my hand/ I take this magnetic force of a man to be my lover." Swift said the cited lyrics were special to her, because it made her reflect on her past songwriting about failed relationships and heartbreak. The narrator promises to stay with her lover, "You'll save all your dirtiest jokes for me/ And at every table, I'll save you a seat." Some media publications noticed the lyric, "My heart's been borrowed and yours has been blue," drawing on the bridal rhyme "Something old", which describes the bridal costume on her wedding day, "Something old, something new, something borrowed, something blue."

Critics related the song's theme to Swift's past songs, with many drawing similarities between the narratives of "Lover" and "New Year's Day", a song taken from Reputation (2017). Jane Song from Paste noted the intertwined storylines between the two songs, dubbing "Lover" a sequel: "They're cleaning up bottles as they laugh at their friends passed out in the living room." Reviewers commented the narrator on "Lover" finally lives up her happily-ever-after dream that Swift's past songs strived for. Vincent opined that the "guitar string scars" imagery is an allusion to Swift's albums Red (2012) and 1989 (2014), on which she moved from country to pop. Meanwhile, Rob Sheffield of Rolling Stone deemed "Lover" a sequel to "Last Kiss", a song off Speak Now (2010), "but with a decade's worth more soul going into it". In Vulture, Craig Jenkins noticed its intimate and introspective sentiments after the two preceding singles for the album—"Me!" and "You Need to Calm Down"—which have lyrics concerning the outer world and empowering oneself. Jenkins surmised that after the negative press surrounding Reputation, "Lover" reflected Swift's desire to "want nothing more than a quiet place to retreat to when the rigors of life in public get her down".

niñiata de mielda=
Swift previewed "Lover" and part of the lyrics in a Vogue cover interview published on August 8, 2019. Three days later, she announced its release date at the 2019 Teen Choice Awards. Republic Records released "Lover" for digital download and streaming on August 16, 2019. The same day, a lyric video was released onto YouTube; it shows the song's lyrics projected onto a white bedsheet, on which home videos play in the background. On September 5, 2019, Billboard reported that "Lover" was the third radio single from the album, released to US pop and adult contemporary formats.

Republic Records released three alternate versions of "Lover". The first, a duet remix featuring Canadian singer Shawn Mendes, was released on November 13, 2019. Mendes contributed verses written by himself. Media publications praised Mendes's verses and falsetto vocals, but complained that they occasionally became cloying. The second, a remix subtitled "First Dance Remix", whose title refers to a newly-wed couple's opening dance at a wedding, was released on November 26, 2019. Featuring an orchestral arrangement used in Swift's performance at the 2019 American Music Awards, it received positive reviews for its ballroom atmosphere. The third, a live version subtitled "Live at Paris", recorded at Swift's City of Lover concert, was released on May 17, 2020.

Music video
The music video for "Lover", directed by Swift and Drew Kirsch, premiered on YouTube on August 22, 2019, hours before the album's release. Christian Owens, a dancer on Swift's 1989 and Reputation tours, stars as the male lead. The video was filmed in a set in Hollywood. According to Swift, its concept was inspired by the lyric "You two are dancing in a snow globe round and round" from the song "You Are in Love", a song about two best friends in love, taken from Swift's album 1989.

The video begins with a child receiving a snow globe as a gift on Christmas day, before focusing on the dollhouse inside the snow globe. Swift and Owens portray a couple who live in the house, which has seven distinctly-colored rooms. Each features scenes of the couple's domestic life through the ups and downs of their love. For instance, the green room shows Swift's character playing drums, the yellow room features the couple playing board games, the blue room has a giant fishbowl in which the couple swim, and an attic is where they reminisce by watching home videos. At the end, the child who receives the snow globe is revealed to be the couple's daughter. The video includes easter eggs to many of Swift's other songs. Media outlets welcomed the video's romantic and dreamy atmosphere; Teen Vogue Mary Elizabeth Andriotis compared the cinematography to the films of director Wes Anderson.

Critical reception
"Lover" was met with widespread critical acclaim, and seen as a large improvement compared to the lukewarm reception of the upbeat singles Swift had released before. They praised what they described as intimate lyrics and a romantic production. Jay Willis of GQ, in a review of the album Lover, dubbed the song "the best love story" that Swift had ever produced. Many critics commended "Lover" as a testament to Swift's talents as a singer-songwriter, with Abby Aguirre of Vogue describing the song as a "romantic, haunting [...] singer-songwritery nugget". Slate critic Carl Wilson found the songwriting "replete with the little twists of phrase and zoomed-in details that make the best Swift songs so Swifty". The Independent Alexandra Pollard called it a reminder of Swift's ability to "distil infatuation into something specific and universal".

The production was another point of praise. Zoladz said that "Lover", which she deemed the best single off the album, did not have commercial potential because it sounded like an outlier on radio, but for a good reason: "It's destined for more sacred spaces, like headphones, lonely car rides home after dropping someone off at an airport, and first dances at weddings." Bruton and Vincent described the romantic, "sepia-toned haze" as a welcoming artistic direction for Swift after the "messy clapbacks and vengeful undertones" directed at her media image on Reputation. NPR's Katie Alice Greer and The Boston Globe Nora Princiotti lauded the bridge, with the former adding that the snare drums were her favorite sound on the album. Wilson lauded the "musical self-assuredness" that makes "Lover" a compelling track, and Toronto Star critic Ben Rayner opined that the stripped-down production, compared to other upbeat album tracks, highlights Swift's vocals and makes it a standout.

Critics have featured "Lover" highly on rankings of all songs in Swift's discography, including Vulture Nate Jones (2021), who ranked it 13th out of 179 songs; NME Hannah Mylrea (2020), 12th out of 161, and Paste Jane Song (2020), 6th out of 158. O'Connor ranked it 10th out of select 100 album tracks by Swift, lauding it as an experimental work "impressively bold this far into her career". Sheffield ranked "Lover" seventh in his 2021 ranking of Swift's 206-song catalog, praising her vocals as "the sensation at the top of the roller coaster when you realize you're zooming all the way down", and the use of the word "lover": "She reclaims the cringiest noun in the language and makes it credible for the first time since Prince sang, 'I Wanna Be Your Lover'."

Rankings
"Lover" featured on many publications' lists of the best songs of 2019. Cosmopolitan included it in the top 10, Elle placed it second among the "19 best love songs", and Idolator ranked it 63rd among the "75 best pop songs" of 2019. The track featured on unranked lists by Marie Claire and The Philadelphia Inquirer. Other publications that prominently ranked "Lover" in their year-end lists included Billboard (21st), Complex (35th), and Pitchfork (87th). In individual critics' lists, the song topped the list by David Farr from the Sarasota Herald-Tribune and made it to the top 10 (unranked) by Wilson. Insider included "Lover" at number 104 in their list of the 113 best songs of the 2010s decade.

Commercial performance
In the United States, "Lover" debuted atop the Hot Digital Songs chart with 35,000 digital copies sold first-week, giving Swift her 18th chart topper and extending her record as the artist with the most Hot Digital Songs number-one songs. On the Billboard Hot 100 chart dated August 31, 2019, it debuted at number 19. After its music video was released, the song rose to number 10 on the next charting week, becoming Lover third top-10 single and Swift's 25th top-10 chart entry. It spent a total of 22 weeks on the Hot 100. On Billboard airplay charts, the single peaked at numbers six on Adult Top 40, 10 on Adult Contemporary, and 16 on Mainstream Top 40. The Recording Industry Association of America, in October 2020, certified "Lover" double platinum for surpassing two million units based on sales and streaming.

"Lover" peaked within the top 20 on singles charts of other English-speaking countries, reaching number three in both Australia and New Zealand, number seven in Canada, number nine in Ireland, number 12 in Scotland, and number 14 in the United Kingdom. The single was certified platinum by the British Phonographic Industry, double platinum by the Australian Recording Industry Association, and triple platinum by Music Canada. In other countries, "Lover" reached number 14 on Poland's airplay chart and was certified platinum by the Polish Society of the Phonographic Industry; it also reached the top five in Lebanon and Singapore, and top 20 in Lithuania, Latvia, and Estonia, and was certified platinum by the Associação Fonográfica Portuguesa in Portugal.

Awards and nominations
At the 62nd Annual Grammy Awards in 2020, "Lover" was nominated for Song of the Year, becoming Swift's fourth nomination in the category after "You Belong with Me" (2010), "Shake It Off" (2015), and "Blank Space" (2016), and her first solo-written nomination. It lost to "Bad Guy", written by Billie Eilish and Finneas O'Connell; according to the Los Angeles Times, the Grammy loss prompted speculation on whether it was affected by Swift's ongoing dispute with talent manager Scooter Braun and her former label Big Machine, over the acquisition of the master recordings to her past albums. At the 2020 Nashville Songwriter Awards, organized by the Nashville Songwriters Association International, "Lover" was listed among "10 Songs I Wish I'd Written".

The single was one of the "10 International Gold Songs" awarded at Hong Kong's RTHK International Pop Poll Awards, and the Shawn Mendes remix was nominated for Best Remix at the iHeartRadio Music Awards. In 2021, Broadcast Music, Inc. during the BMI Pop Awards honored "Lover" as one of the 50 most-performed songs throughout the year, based on airplay and streaming performance. The music video won Best Production Design in a Video at the MVPA Awards, and received nominations for Favorite International Video at the Philippines' Myx Music Awards and Best Music Video and Best Cinematography at Poland's Camerimage film festival. At the 2020 MTV Video Music Awards, "Lover" was nominated for Best Pop Video and Best Art Direction. Kurt Gefke, the video's production designer, received a nomination in the "Short Format" category at the ADG Excellence in Production Design Awards.

Live performances and cover versions

Swift performed "Lover" live on many occasions during promotion of the album in 2019. She first reprised it as part of a medley with "You Need to Calm Down" at the 2019 MTV Video Music Awards, on August 26; she played the song a pink guitar and was surrounded with blue lights and a hovering moon. She sang "Lover" as part of a mini-concert held at BBC Radio 1's Live Lounge, which premiered on September 2. On September 9, she included it in the set list to her one-off City of Lover concert in Paris. In October, she performed the song on Saturday Night Live, where she sang a stripped-down, piano-led version, at a Tiny Desk Concert for NPR Music, and at the We Can Survive charity concert in Los Angeles. On November 10, Swift sang the track on the piano at the Alibaba Singles' Day Gala in Shanghai.

At the 2019 American Music Awards on November 24, where Swift was honored as Artist of the Decade, she performed a medley of select singles, which included "Lover" with an orchestral arrangement. During the song, Swift played and sang on a piano, donning a pink cape with gold detailing, as Misty Copeland and Craig Hall performed a ballet. Variety Chris Willman selected Swift's medley as the night's most memorable highlight, opining that the lush, string-laden orchestral atmosphere and the ballet performance elevated the show to a high point. The orchestral arrangement was incorporated into the original track, released as the "First Dance Remix". In December, she performed the song at Capital FM's Jingle Bell Ball 2019 in London and at iHeartRadio Z100's Jingle Ball in New York City. On December 14, Swift performed the song at the finale of BBC One's Strictly Come Dancing. Swift included "Lover" on the set list for the Eras Tour (2023).

Country musician Keith Urban covered "Lover" at his Washington State Fair concert on August 31, 2019. He had showed gratitude for "Lover", which he described as "so exquisitely written [...] gorgeously crafted" that made him appreciate the "art of making music", on social media, and after the performance said he wish he had composed the song himself. Urban's cover was nominated for Best Cover Song at the 2020 iHeartRadio Music Awards. On March 4, 2020, Irish singer Niall Horan and American singer Fletcher released a cover version of the song, titled "Lover – Recorded at Air Studios, London", exclusively on Spotify. Critics described the cover as a power ballad combining rock styles such as pop rock and arena rock, with electric guitars, keyboard chords, and loud drums. On his decision to cover "Lover", Horan lauded it as a "classic" and expressed admiration for Swift's music.

Credits and personnel
"Lover" (album version)

 Taylor Swift – vocals, songwriter, producer
 Jack Antonoff – producer, programmer, recording engineer, acoustic guitar, bass guitar, piano, keyboard, drums, percussion
 Serban Ghenea – mixing
 John Hanes – mix engineer
 John Rooney – assistant recording engineer
 Laura Sisk – recording engineer

"Lover" (Remix featuring Shawn Mendes)

 Taylor Swift – vocals, songwriter, producer
 Jack Antonoff – producer, programmer, recording engineer, acoustic guitar, bass guitar, piano, keyboard, drums, percussion
 Serban Ghenea – mixing
 John Hanes – mix engineer
 John Rooney – assistant recording engineer
 Laura Sisk – recording engineer
 Shawn Mendes – vocals, songwriter
 Mike Gnocato – vocal engineer
 Scott Harris – songwriter
 George Seara – vocal engineer
 Zubin Thakkar – vocal producer

Charts

Weekly charts

Shawn Mendes remix

Year-end charts

Certifications

Release history

See also
List of Billboard Hot 100 top-ten singles in 2019
List of number-one digital songs of 2019 (U.S.)
List of top 10 singles in 2019 (Australia)

References

2010s ballads
2019 singles
2019 songs
Alternative country songs
American folk songs
Country ballads
Folk ballads
Indie folk songs
Republic Records singles
Song recordings produced by Taylor Swift
Song recordings produced by Jack Antonoff
Songs written by Taylor Swift
Songs written by Shawn Mendes
Songs written by Scott Harris (songwriter)
Taylor Swift songs
Shawn Mendes songs
Torch songs
Male–female vocal duets
Music videos directed by Taylor Swift